

Seasons 

 2017 UPH Eagles Basketball Team 
 2018 UPH Eagles Basketball Team

Off Season

Out

In

Player And Coach 2018-19 
Player :

Official

List Season LIMA

Player at IBL 

Basketball teams in Indonesia